The 1410 Yellow River flood was a natural disaster affecting the area around Kaifeng, China, during the early Ming dynasty.

It struck during the early years of the reign of the usurping Yongle Emperor, damaging thousands of acres of farmland and killing more than 14,000 families.

References

History of Kaifeng
Disasters in Ming dynasty
Kaifeng Flood, 1410
Yellow River Flood, 1410
Yellow River floods
15th-century floods

Disasters in Henan